The 1925–26 Scottish Second Division was won by Dunfermline Athletic who, along with second placed Clyde, were promoted to the First Division. Broxburn United finished bottom.

Table

References 

 Scottish Football Archive

Scottish Division Two seasons
2
Scot